Khaled Fahad Al-Atwi (born 13 April 1977) is a Saudi Arabian professional football manager and former player who was most recently the head coach of Al-Qadsiah.

Al-Atwi began his coaching career as the manager of Al-Oyoon. A year later he joined Al-Nojoom and led them to the First Division. In 2016, he was appointed as the manager of Saudi Arabia U20 national team. In 2019, Al-Atwi became the manager of Pro League side Al-Ettifaq.

Managerial career
Al-Atwi began his coaching career in the youth teams of Al-Oyoon in 2008. He then became the assistant manager of Al-Fateh's youth team before rejoining Al-Oyoon to become the first team manager in 2009. In 2011, Al-Atwi was appointed as the first team manager of Al-Nojoom. In his 5 seasons at the club, Al-Atwi led Al-Nojoom to promotion to the Second Division and the First Division respectively. On June 14 2016, Al-Atwi was appointed as the manager of the Saudi Arabia U20 national team. He led the young falcons to a first-place finish in the 2018 AFC U-19 Championship and was also the manager during the disastrous 2019 FIFA U-20 World Cup where Saudi Arabia exited from the group stage with a crushing defeat. By doing so, Al-Atwi became the youngest Saudi manager to lead the national team to continental glory. On 17 June 2019, Al-Atwi resigned from his post as the manager of the U20 national team after 3 years. Later on the same day, he was announced as the manager of Pro League club Al-Ettifaq. On 14 October 2021, it was announced that Al-Atwi and Al-Ettifaq agreed to end their contract mutually and he would take charge of his last match on 16 October against Al-Ahli. 

On 18 June 2022, it was announced that Al-Atwi was appointed as the new manager of First Division League side Al-Qadsiah. On 22 September 2022, Al-Atwi was sacked after 5 matches, he drew twice and lost three times.

Personal life
Al-Atwi was born in Dammam but moved to Al-Oyoon, located in the Al-Ahsa Governorate, during his childhood. He is married and has four sons; Fahad, Saud, Mohammed, and Sattam. Al-Atwi graduated from King Faisal University and has a Bachelor's degree in Sociology. He used to work as a history teacher in a school in Urayrah. He later became a principal of a school in Al Kulabiyah.

Managerial statistics

Honours

Manager
Al-Nojoom
Saudi Third Division: 2012–13
Saudi Second Division runners-up: 2014–15

Saudi Arabia U20
AFC U-19 Championship: 2018
GCC U-19 Championship: 2016

Individual
Saudi Professional League Manager of the Month: December 2020

References

External links

1977 births
Living people
People from Dammam
Saudi Arabian footballers
Association football midfielders
Al Oyoon FC players
Saudi Fourth Division players
Saudi Arabian football managers
Saudi Professional League managers
Saudi First Division League managers
Ettifaq FC managers
Al-Qadisiyah FC managers